Emil and the Piglet is a 1973 Swedish film, the third of three films based on the Emil i Lönneberga books written by Astrid Lindgren. At the 10th Guldbagge Awards in 1974, Allan Edwall won the award for Best Actor.

Cast
 Jan Ohlsson as Emil Svensson
 Lena Wisborg as Ida Svensson
 Allan Edwall as Anton Svensson
 Emy Storm as Alma Svensson
 Björn Gustafson as Alfred
 Maud Hansson as Lina
 Georg Årlin as the priest
 Carsta Löck as Krösa-Maja
 Hannelore Schroth as fru Petrell
 Jan Nygren as the auctioneer in Backhorva
 Pierre Lindstedt as Bulten i Bo
 Göthe Grefbo as Kråkstorparn
 Wilhelm Clason as Bastefallarn
 Curt Masreliez as a Good Templar
 Hans-Eric Stenborg as a Good Templar
 Sven Holmberg as a Good Templar
 Gisela Hahn as the lady teacher

References

External links
 
 

1973 films
Swedish children's films
1970s Swedish-language films
Films based on Emil of Lönneberga
Films directed by Olle Hellbom
1970s Swedish films